Single Whip (單鞭 dān biān) is a common posture found in most forms of t'ai chi ch'uan. Typically at the end of the posture the left hand is in a palm outward push and the right hand held most commonly in the form of a hook or closed fist. Notable exceptions are the Single Whip in Sun-style and Wu/Hao style t'ai chi ch'uan which finish with both hands open, palms outward.

Single Whip is one of the movements/postures most repeated in the solo training forms, such as t'ai chi.  Its first appearance in most forms follows the Grasp Sparrow's Tail sequence (peng, lu, ji, an) and is seen later in Snake Creeps Down. There is also a posture in the Wu style sword form called Single Whip Fusing Throat.

The martial applications of Single Whip are many. There are various strikes, throws, changeups (using one hand to create an opening so that the other can strike) and kicks derived from this posture trained by different schools.

See also
List of t'ai chi ch'uan forms

References

External links
Single Whip Illustrations: Yang, Wu, Chen, Sun and Modern Styles

Tai chi
Stances